Chloroethyl chloroformates (chemical formula: C3H4Cl2O2) are a pair of related chemical compounds. They can be used to form protecting groups and as N-dealkylating agents.

They are listed as extremely hazardous substances.

References

Chloroformates